The Old Mutual Mangaung Cup is an annual pre-season association football tournament. The cup is sponsored by Old Mutual Emerging Markets, a Licensed Financial Services Provider.

External links

Official site

References

Soccer cup competitions in South Africa